"Build My Life" is a song by American contemporary worship musician Pat Barrett. It was released as the third single from his eponymous debut studio album on December 21, 2018. The song was originally released by American contemporary worship band Housefires on their album, Housefires III (2016). Barrett co-wrote the song with Brett Younker, Karl Martin, Kirby Kaple, and Matt Redman. Ed Cash produced the single.

"Build My Life" peaked at number four on the US Hot Christian Songs chart. "Build My Life" was nominated for the GMA Dove Awards for Worship Song of the Year and Worship Recorded Song of the Year at the 2019 GMA Dove Awards.

Background
Pat Barrett released an extended play containing different versions of "Build My Life" on December 21, 2018. The song was released to Christian radio stations in the United States on January 4, 2019, becoming the second single from his debut album, Pat Barrett (2018), following the release of "The Way (New Horizon)" and "Sails".

Barrett shared the inspiration behind the song, saying ""Build My Life" is one of those songs for me personally, that has carried me through so many years of change and uncertainty and if I’ve learned anything from being a father of three kids and Megan and I just celebrating nine years, its that life rarely behaves with our plansand its usually in the uncertainty and the not knowing and the trials that reveals what we’ve been standing on and what we put our trust in. Jesus talks about it in Luke Ch 6 and says its like a man who dug a hole and built his house on the rock, when the storm came and the house withstood the storm. This really is a reminder for us that we can build our life on anything, we have the freedom to build our life on whatever we want. And the invitation of Jesus is to build our lives on things that last."

Composition

Reception

Critical response
Tony Cummings of Cross Rhythms wrote in his review of the "Build My Life" EP: "As all followers of modern worship know, Atlanta-based Pat is the composer of the "Good Good Father" classic and this gem of a song is every bit as memorable - an instantly singable melody and a lyric which contemplates God's holiness and a being worthy of building our life upon. One of the best worship songs of the year and whether you choose the solitary Barrett version or the one featuring Cory Asbury, it's one you'll want to return to again and again.". Reviewing for 365 Days of Inspiring Media, Jonathan Andre opined that "For such a song like this is rooted very much in Scripture, as we are met with arguably one of Pat Barrett’s best work, ever (and arguably my favourite song from his debut album)."

Accolades

Commercial performance
"Build My Life" debuted at number 38 on the US Christian Airplay chart dated January 5, 2019. The song became Barrett's second Christian Airplay top ten entry, peaking at number one on the chart.

"Build My Life" debuted at number 31 on the US Hot Christian Songs chart dated January 12, 2019. The song peaked at number four on the Hot Christian Songs chart.

Music videos
Pat Barrett released the official audio video for the song via YouTube on March 30, 2018. Pat Barrett released the live performance video for "Build My Life" featuring Chris Tomlin through YouTube on December 20, 2018. On January 4, 2019, the official lyric video for the song featuring Cory Asbury was availed on YouTube.

Track listing
All tracks were produced by Ed Cash except where stated.

Charts

Weekly charts

Year-end charts

Release history

Cover versions
 Passion released a live version of the song featuring Brett Younker on their album, Worthy of Your Name (2017).
 Christy Nockels released her version of "Build My Life" as a single.
 Shane & Shane covered the song for their album, The Worship Initiative Vol. 14 (2017).
 Bright City released an instrumental version of the song on their album, Bright City Presents: Still, Volume 2 (2018).
 Chris Tomlin released a live version of the song featuring Pat Barrett on his album, Holy Roar: Live from Church (2019).
 Noel Robinson covered the song for his album, I Surrender (2019).
 Bethel Music released their rendition of the song featuring Pat Barrett on their album, Peace, Vol. II (2021).
 Tribl released a live cover of the song featuring Joe L Barnes, Ryan Ofei and Jekalyn Carr on their album, Tribl Nights Atlanta (2021).

References

External links
 
  on PraiseCharts

2018 singles
2018 songs